is a Japanese film director and novelist.

Biography
Ando's father is actor Eiji Okuda and her mother the essayist Kazu Ando.  She studied in the United Kingdom, and graduated from the University of London's Faculty of Arts. Later on, Ando went to New York University and learned film making, and started working as supervisory assistant.

In 2010, she made her directorial debut with the film Kakera: A Piece of Our Life based on a manga.  In 2011, Ando wrote the novel 0.5 mm.

In 2014, she married a man. In the same year, Ando made her novel 0.5 mm into the film of the same name, and served as the screenwriter and director. The film starred her sister Sakura Ando. The movie was filmed in Kōchi, Kōchi.

Works

Films
※Directorial works only

Novels

Filmography

Radio

Advertisements

Awards

See also
 List of female film and television directors
 List of LGBT-related films directed by women

References

External links
 (in which it includes her personal profile) 
 

Japanese women film directors
Alumni of the University of London
1982 births
Date of birth unknown
Place of birth unknown
Living people